Glaucocharis euchromiella is a species of moth in the family Crambidae described by Émile Louis Ragonot in 1895. It is found on Crete and in Syria, Armenia and the Taurus and Antitaurus Mountains.

References

Moths described in 1895
Diptychophorini
Moths of Europe